WHDF (channel 15) is a television station licensed to Florence, Alabama, United States, serving the Huntsville area with programming from The CW. It is owned and operated by network majority owner Nexstar Media Group alongside CBS affiliate WHNT-TV (channel 19). Both stations share studios on Holmes Avenue Northwest in downtown Huntsville, while WHDF's transmitter is located southeast of Minor Hill, Tennessee.

In addition to its own digital signal, WHDF is simulcast in 720p high definition on WHNT-TV's second digital subchannel (19.2) from a transmitter on Monte Sano Mountain.

History
The station began on October 28, 1957 as WOWL-TV, based in Florence. The station was owned by Richard "Dick" Biddle's TV Muscle Shoals, Inc. Up until late 1999, that station broadcast NBC programs to northwestern Alabama and portions of southern middle Tennessee and northeastern Mississippi; it also carried some popular CBS shows like the soap opera As the World Turns.

WOWL-TV always faced competing NBC affiliates in Huntsville/Decatur (in later years WAFF, channel 48) or even Tupelo (WTVA), whose signals reached much of its broadcast area. However, it retained viewership in northwest Alabama (Florence, Sheffield, Muscle Shoals, Tuscumbia and areas known as "The Shoals" in recent times and referred to as "The Quad Cities" years ago) by offering local newscasts, which for most of the station's 40-plus years were the only newscasts concerned specifically with northwestern Alabama. Over time, though, with the Huntsville stations, especially WAFF, expanding news bureaus of their own into the Shoals in the 1980s and 1990s, WOWL-TV lost much of its traditional advantage.

By the late 1990s, this duplication had progressed to the point that the station could no longer focus solely on northwest Alabama and remain viable. The owners opted to sell to outside interests, who dropped NBC in favor of UPN in the fall of 1999, making WAFF the sole NBC outlet in north Alabama. Shortly before that, on July 19, the call letters were changed to the current WHDF, with a move of the transmitter and tower to Giles County, Tennessee. The new tower transmitted from a location high enough to provide a coverage area comparable to the other north Alabama stations, while remaining within  of Florence as required by FCC regulations.

In 2004, Lockwood Broadcast Group acquired WHDF. Lockwood provided content delivery and back-office function from the company's headquarters in Virginia. Completed in 2007, the "hub" facility has remotely operated WHDF since that year.

In September 2006, both UPN and The WB ceased operations. A single new network, The CW, replaced those two struggling entities. WHDF, the UPN affiliate, was granted the northern Alabama affiliation rights for the new network earlier that year, and rebranded as The Valley's CW at midnight on July 27, 2006. (The former WB affiliate, meanwhile, became WAMY-TV, affiliated with MyNetworkTV.)

Local employees at WHDF's Florence and Huntsville facilities totaled fewer than ten, according to Census business statistics in 2010.

On July 15, 2018, Lockwood Broadcast Group reached an agreement to sell WHDF to Nexstar Media Group for $2.25 million; Nexstar concurrently took over the station's operations through a time brokerage agreement. The sale was completed on November 9, creating a duopoly with Fox affiliate WZDX (channel 54).

On December 3, 2018, Nexstar announced it would acquire the assets of Chicago-based Tribune Media—which has owned CBS affiliate WHNT-TV since December 2013—for $6.4 billion in cash and debt. Nexstar was precluded from acquiring WHNT directly or indirectly, as FCC regulations prohibit common ownership of more than two stations in the same media market, or two or more of the four highest-rated stations in the market. (Furthermore, any attempt by Nexstar to assume the operations of WHNT through local marketing or shared services agreements would have been subject to regulatory hurdles that could have delayed completion of the FCC and Justice Department's review and approval process for the acquisition.) As such, Nexstar opted to keep WHNT and sell WZDX to a separate, unrelated company to address the ownership conflict. (As that station does not rank among the top four in total-day viewership and therefore is not in conflict with existing FCC in-market ownership rules, WHDF optionally can be retained by Nexstar regardless of whether it chooses to retain ownership of WZDX or sell WZDX in order to acquire WHNT or, should it be divested, be sold to the prospective buyer of WZDX.) The sale was approved by the FCC on September 16 and was completed on September 19, 2019.

Technical information

Subchannels
The station's digital signal is multiplexed:

Analog-to-digital conversion
WHDF shut down its analog signal, over UHF channel 15, on June 12, 2009, as part of the federally mandated transition from analog to digital television. The station's digital signal remained on its pre-transition UHF channel 14, using PSIP to display WHDF's virtual channel as 15 on digital television receivers.

References

External links

Nexstar Media Group
The CW affiliates
Court TV affiliates
Television channels and stations established in 1957
1957 establishments in Alabama
Florence–Muscle Shoals metropolitan area
HDF